The 18th Alberta Legislative Assembly was in session from May 15, 1975, to February 14, 1979, with the membership of the assembly determined by the results of the 1975 Alberta general election held on March 26, 1975. The Legislature officially resumed on May 15, 1975, and continued until the fourth session was prorogued on November 3, 1978 and dissolved on February 14, 1979, prior to the 1979 Alberta general election on March 14, 1979.

Alberta's eighteenth government was controlled by the majority Progressive Conservative Association of Alberta for the second time, led by Premier Peter Lougheed. The Official Opposition was led by Robert Curtis Clark of the Social Credit Party.  The Speaker was Gerard Amerongen who would serve in the role until he was defeated in the 1986 Alberta general election.

Second session

During the second session the government introduced The Alberta Heritage Savings Trust Fund Act (Bill 35) creating a sovereign wealth fund to invest oil and gas revenue to ensure the exploitation of non-renewable resources would be of long-term benefit for Alberta. The Alberta Heritage Savings Trust Fund had been announced by Premier Peter Lougheed a year earlier with the intent of diverting funds from the Alberta Petroleum Marketing Commission on the sale of crude oil from April 1, 1974 to diversify and strengthen the economy, improve the life of Albertans, stimulate the economy, and continue to grow with interest.

Party standings after the 18th General Election

 A party requires four seats to have official party status in the legislature. Parties with fewer than four seats are not entitled to party funding although their members will usually be permitted to sit together in the chamber.

Members elected
For complete electoral history, see individual districts.

References

Further reading

External links
Alberta Legislative Assembly
Legislative Assembly of Alberta Members Book
By-elections 1905 to present

18